Sri Maharaja Sang Sapurba Paduka Sri Trimurti Tri Buana, (1245–1316) also known as Sri Nila Pahlawan, is a figure in the Malay Annals, highly revered as the legendary great ancestor of some of the major dynasties of the Malay world: Singapura, Malacca, Pahang, Johor, Perak, Kelantan, Terengganu and Siak Sri Indrapura. Legend has it that after his accession to Seguntang Hill with his two younger brothers, Sang Sapurba enters into a sacred covenant with Demang Lebar Daun the native ruler of Palembang, which laid the basis of the proper relationship between the Malay rulers and the subjects. The legendary sword believed to be carried by the king, the Cura Si Manjakini, is now formed part of the regalia of Perak Sultanate, whose rulers are said directly descended from the king. The details of Sang Sapurba stories are mainly composed of folklore and legends, and thus his historical existence is debated and disputed by modern historians. Even so, as De Jong argued in her article The Character of Malay Annals,  the stories of the Malay Annals could have been realistically mixed with the historical figures and events.

Legend
Tradition in the Malay Annals hold that the founder of the major line of rulers in the Malay world was a prince named Sang Sapurba who alleged to be the descendant of Dhul-Qarnayn. Sang Sapurba, then known as Sri Nila Pahlawan first revealed himself with his younger brothers, Sri Krishna Pandita and Sri Nila Utama, upon the sacred hill of Seguntang in the hinterland of Palembang. The name of the princes varied in different versions of the Malay Annals. In Winstedt's version, they are known as Bichitram, Paladutani dan Nilatanam, while in Abdullah's version, they are Bichitram Syah, Nila Pahlawan dan Kama Pandita. Two young women who dwelt upon the hill, Wan Empuk and Wan Malini, are said to have seen a great light shining through the darkness of night. On ascending the hill in the morning they found that their rice crops had transformed the grain into gold, the leaves into silver, the stalks into golden brass. Proceeding further, they came across three young men, the eldest of whom was mounted on a silver white bull and was dressed as a king, while the two younger, his brothers, bore a sword, a lance and a signet that indicated sovereign power. The two women were greatly astonished at the refined appearance and elegant apparel of the young men, and thought that they must be the cause of the phenomenon which had appeared in their rice grounds. The curious young women immediately inquired who they were, where they came from and whether they were spirits or fairies. The eldest prince replied that they were neither spirits nor fairies, but that of men and they are princes from the line of the Great Alexander seeking his inheritance on earth. Then, Wan Empuk and Wan Malini asked what proofs they could produce of the truth of this relation, Nila Pahlawan said that let the crown he is wearing serves an evidence of descent and if any farther proof wanting, consider the phenomenon which the women have seen on their rice grounds. Then out of the mouth of the bull there issued a sweet-voiced herald, who at once proclaimed in Sanskrit language, the eldest prince to be a king bearing the title of 'Sang Sapurba Trimurti Tri Buana'.

The Covenant
The newly installed sovereign afterwards descended from the hill of Seguntang into the great plain watered by the Palembang river, where he married Wan Sendari, the daughter of the local chief, Demang Lebar Daun, and was everywhere accepted as ruler of the land. Prior to his marriage, Sang Sapurba made the famous pact with Demang Lebar Daun, who abdicated in favour of him:
 

 
At a later date Sang Sapurba  is said to have crossed the great central range of Sumatra into the Minangkabau Highlands, where one of his warriors, Permasku Mambang, slew the great serpent Saktimuna using his legendary sword, Cura Si Manjakini, and was made the king of a grateful people and the founder of the long line of Princes of Minangkabau.

Royal dynasties
A. Samad Ahmad's version of the Malay Annals identified Sri Tri Buana who reigned in Palembang and the founder of ancient Singapura as the youngest brother of Sang Sapurba, Sri Nila Utama. In A. Samad Ahmad's version, Sang Sapurba was said to have reigned only in Minangkabau. On the other hand, Shellabear and Leyden's versions noted that Sang Nila Utama who reigned in Bintan and later founded ancient Singapura was the son of Sang Sapurba. The Misa Melayu and Silsilah Perak that contains comprehensive genealogical tree of the Sultans of Perak agreed with Shellabear and Leyden's versions, tracing the lineage of the rulers of Perak directly from Sang Sapurba. If these versions of the Malay Annals and the Perak text are to be taken into account, the line of rulers descended from Sang Sapurba should have begun with Sang Nila Utama who founded the Kingdom of Singapura in 1299. Four generations of rulers reigned over the island kingdom before the last ruler, known in certain accounts as Parameswara, fled after a Majapahit invasion in 1398. In 1400, Parameswara reached the mouth of Bertam river in Malay peninsula, where he established Melaka Sultanate. During the reign of Mansur Shah of Melaka (r. 1459–1477), an heir apparent named Raja Muhammad whose mother was a captured princess of Pahang, was banished for committing murder and went into exile. He was then proclaimed and installed as Sultan of Pahang in 1470. The Portuguese invasion of Melaka in 1511 caused a major split of the royal house when Muzaffar Shah the son of Mahmud Shah of Melaka (r.1488–1511) was invited by the people of Perak to rule the state. Another son, Alauddin Riayat Shah II established the Johor Sultanate to succeed Melaka in 1528.

In 1636, the Achehnese installed a prince from Siak to the throne of Perak following the demise of Sultan Salehuddin Shah (r.1630–1635)  in exile in Aceh. The new Sultan who reigned as Muzaffar Shah II (r. 1636–1654) also claimed descent from a branch of Sang Sapurba dynasty in Siak. He married Fatima Puteh the elder daughter of Raja Muda of Pahang, Raja 'Abdu'llah by his wife, Putri Perak, who in turn was the granddaughter of Sultan Mansur Shah I of Perak (r. 1549–1577). Earlier in 1623, Pahang was united with the crown of Johor and the rulers from Melaka dynasty continued to reign in the state until 1688, when the Bendahara of Johor effectively consolidated the state as his personal fief.

The royal line of Sang Sapurba was finally ended in Johor when Mahmud Shah II of Johor (r. 1685–1699) was assassinated by Megat Seri Rama, popularly known as Laksamana Bintan, leaving behind no male heir. As a result, Bendahara Abdul Jalil declared himself the next Sultan of Johor. Upon ascending the throne, the new Sultan Abdul Jalil IV killed all the wives of Sultan Mahmud to avoid the possibility of any future claims to the throne. However, according to the Hikayat Negeri Johor (Chronicles of the State of Johor) and the Pahang Manuscripts, a wife by the name of Cik Apung the daughter of Laksamana managed to escape to Minangkabau and gave birth to Raja Kechil. Less than two decades later in 1717, Raja Kechil would assemble a fleet from Minangkabau and succeed temporarily in ousting Sultan Abdul Jalil's successor Sultan Sulaiman and gain the Johor Sultanate, basing his legitimacy on the claim that he was the post-humous son of Sultan Mahmud Shah II. However, Bugis mercenaries that assisted him in this campaign changed sides and he was eventually forced to flee to Siak, where he founded Siak Sultanate.

References

Bibliography

Malay culture
Malay people